Robert F. Ziegelbauer (born August 26, 1951) is an American politician who served as an independent member of the Wisconsin State Assembly and is the current County Executive of Manitowoc County, Wisconsin. He represented the 25th Assembly District from his election in 1992 until 2013.

Career
Born in Manitowoc, Wisconsin, Ziegelbauer graduated from Roncalli High School. He then graduated from the University of Notre Dame and received his masters from Wharton School of the University of Pennsylvania. Ziegelbauer was a business owner. He served as finance director of the city of Manitowoc; he also served on the Manitowoc County Board of Supervisors and the Manitowoc Common Council. Ziegelbauer also taught at Silver Lake College. He was elected County Executive of Manitowoc County in April 2006. He has since been reelected as County Executive in 2010, 2014, and 2018, for a total of four terms.

Election
Ziegelbauer announced on June 21, 2010 that he would run as an Independent for the 2010 election. He had long been one of the more conservative members of the Democratic caucus, particularly on taxation. On November 2, 2010, Ziegelbauer was reelected to the Wisconsin Assembly. After reelection he stated that he would caucus with the Republicans. In 2012 Ziegelbauer announced he would not run for reelection to the Assembly.

References

External links
 Wisconsin Assembly - Representative Bob Ziegelbauer official government website
 
 Follow the Money - Bob Ziegelbauer
 2008 20062002 2000 1998 campaign contributions
 Campaign 2008 campaign contributions at Wisconsin Democracy Campaign

1951 births
Living people
Wisconsin Independents
Wisconsin city council members
County supervisors in Wisconsin
County executives in Wisconsin
Members of the Wisconsin State Assembly
University of Notre Dame alumni
Wharton School of the University of Pennsylvania alumni
Wisconsin Democrats
Silver Lake College faculty
21st-century American politicians